Badal Choudhury is an Indian politician and member of the Communist Party of India (Marxist). Chowdhury is a member of the Tripura Legislative Assembly from the Hrishyamukh constituency in South Tripura district. He was minister of Health & Family Welfare and Revenue and Public Works (in Manik Sarkar Government) during 2013–18.

Political career 
Badal Choudhury was very active in student movements in his student days. In 1968 at the age of 17, he became a member of the Communist Party of India (Marxist). In  1972–1981, he was the Secretary of C.P.I.(M) Belonia Divisional Committee. During 1974, he was promoted as State Committee Member of C.P.I.(M). In 1977, Choudhury was elected for the first time as Member of Legislative Assembly, Tripura until 1993. In 2008, Choudhury became a Central Committee member of Communist Party of India (Marxist).

References 

People from South Tripura district
Communist Party of India (Marxist) politicians from Tripura
Living people
Tripura politicians
India MPs 1996–1997
Lok Sabha members from Tripura
Tripura MLAs 2018–2023
1951 births